Xia Meng 16 February 1933 – 30 October 2016), a.k.a. Hsia Moon and Miranda Yang, born Yang Meng, was a Hong Kong actress and film producer.  She was a key figure of Hong Kong's Left Wing film scene.

Xia Meng's younger sister Yang Jie played on the China women's national basketball team from 1954 to 1957.

Debut on stage
Xia Meng was first exposed to drama and stage play at McTyeire School, an elite girls' school established by Methodist missionaries in Shanghai. In 1947, she moved with her family to Hong Kong, where she attended Maryknoll Convent School. In 1949, In conjunction with an event at her school, She was chosen to play the leading role in McTyeire School's English-language production of Saint Joan.

Film career
In 1950, Yang Meng (birthname) and her friends visited a film set of the Great Wall Movie Enterprises Ltd. This was where she was first spotted by the crews, as well as studio manager Yuan Yang'an. Through the help of Yuan's daughter, Mao Mei (an actress and ballerina), Yang Meng accepted his invitation and joined the studio at the age of 17. Inspired by Shakespeare's A Midsummer Night's Dream, the new actress decided to rename herself as Xia Meng (literally "summer dream").

The Great Wall Crown Princess

She was given her first role as the title character in Li Pingqian's A Night-Time Wife (1951). The comedy was a hit and rocketed Hsia Moon to stardom. Many other hits followed. There was the tragic demimondaine of Cao Yu's classic adaptation Sunrise, at her best as the virtuous widow of A Widow's Tears both in 1956. She was the scapegoat of the feudal moral value in the critically acclaimed Hong Kong classic The Eternal Love (1960), the deprived bourgeoisie in HKFA Archival Gem's Romance of The Boudoir (1960), and played a man masquerading as a woman in The Bride Hunter (1960).

Xia Meng was one of the few Hong Kong movie stars whose films were released in the People's Republic of China before the Cultural Revolution. She exuded glamour in a manner that was then no longer permitted among her mainland counterparts. The Mainland media nowadays have been frequently quoting her as the Chinese answer to Audrey Hepburn.

Cultural Revolution
In the summer of 1967, she visited Guangzhou and witnessed the chaotic situation where the Cultural Revolution had just started. The dire effect was soon to be felt on Hong Kong's Studios which were influenced by Chinese Communist Party, and Great Wall's movies would no longer have the same cachet as before. Feeling insecure and threatened - as well as being pregnant at the time - she excused herself from involvement in the political movement. Soon after she finished the screen performance in Oh, The Spring Is Here (1967), she resigned from the studio in September, and  quietly left for Canada before the film was released.

Return as movie producer
After the end of The Cultural Revolution, Xia Meng was invited by Liao Chengzhi, vice chairman of the National People's Congress (NPC) of that time, to attend the 4th National Congress of China Federation of Literary and Art Circles(CFLAC) held in Beijing from 30 October—16 November 1979, which is considered to be her first public appearance after her final screen performance in 1967. Under the encouragement of Liao, she decided returned to movie industry as a producer after an absence of ten years.

In 1980, she formed Bluebird Movie Enterprises Ltd, and produced the debut film Boat People (Ann Hui, 1982), a  movie and landmark feature for Hong Kong New Wave, which won several awards including the best picture and best director in the second Hong Kong Film Award. After producing Young Heroes (Mou Dunfei, 1983) and Homecoming (Yim Ho, 1984), Xia Meng sold her film company to Jiang Zuyi. She had no involvement in any film production after that.

Other

Awards
Xia Meng's performance in Peerless Beauty (1953) and A Widow's Tears (1956) won her the Greatest Individual Achievement Award given by the Cultural Ministry of the People's Republic of China. In 1995, Xia Meng was honored the Chinese Film Stars Special Award, in conjunction with 90 anniversary of Chinese Cinema.

Political activities
She was also involved in political activities, being selected as a committee member of the Chinese National Cultural Alliance and the Chinese People's Political Consultative Conference.

Legacy
For her contribution to the motion picture industry, Xia Meng has a star with a hand print and autograph by the name of Miranda Yang on the Avenue of Stars in Tsim Sha Tsui Promenade, Hong Kong.

In August 2005, China honored 128 movie stars in a commemorative stamp collection marking 100 years of Chinese language cinema, Xia Meng was one of the honorees.

Print Pictorials and interviews
Law Kar, Hsia Moon: episodes of a summer dream (Hong Kong 1995); 
Zhu Shunci et al., An age of idealism: Great Wall & Feng Huang days, (Hong Kong Film Archive 2001); 
Liu Shu, The Peerless Xia Meng, China Film Press, Beijing, 2007;

Filmography

References

1933 births
2016 deaths
Hong Kong film producers
Hong Kong film actresses
Actresses from Shanghai
20th-century Hong Kong actresses
20th-century Chinese actresses
Chinese film actresses
Chinese film producers
Members of the National Committee of the Chinese People's Political Consultative Conference
Yue opera actresses